Lamedon may refer to:

Lamedon, a region of Gondor in J. R. R. Tolkien's works
Lamedon (mythology), a king of Sicyon in Greek mythology